Metalurgia Casal was the largest Portuguese motorcycle manufacturer, based in Aveiro. 

Casal may also refer to:
 Casal (grape), a Portuguese wine grape variety
Casalis (also casal), medieval Latin for a group of houses in the countryside

People with the surname
 Antonio Casal (1910–1974), Spanish actor
 Gaspar Casal (1681–1759), Spanish physician who investigated pellagra
 Gregorio Casal (1935–2018), Mexican actor
 Julio J. Casal (1889–1954), Uruguayan poet and critic
 Luz Casal (born 1958), Spanish singer
 Marc Casal (born 1987), Andorran figure skater
 María Casal (born 1958), Spanish actress, daughter of Antonio Casal
 Neal Casal (1968-2019), American singer-songwriter
 Selva Casal (born 1930), Uruguayan poet, daughter of Julio J. Casal
 Sergio Casal (born 1962), Spanish tennis player
 Tino Casal (1950–1991), Spanish singer who died in a car crash
 Julián del Casal (1863–1893), Cuban poet

See also
 
 Casale (disambiguation)
 Casals (surname)
 Casalnuovo (disambiguation)
 Casel (disambiguation)